Gail M. Chase is an American accountant. A Democrat, Chase was elected Maine State Auditor in 1996 by the Maine Legislature. She and other constitutional officers were sworn-in by Governor Angus King on January 3, 1997. Re-elected in 2000, she until the end of her term in January 2005 when she was replaced by fellow Democrat Neria Douglass.

Chase is originally from Pawtucket, Rhode Island and graduated from Colby College in 1974. She was elected to the Maine House of Representatives in 1992 and 1994. She unsuccessfully sought a seat in the Maine Senate in 2006. She is married and lives in Unity, Maine.

References

Year of birth missing (living people)
Living people
Democratic Party members of the Maine House of Representatives
Maine State Auditors
Women state legislators in Maine
Women state constitutional officers of Maine
Politicians from Pawtucket, Rhode Island
People from Unity, Maine
21st-century American women